Calopadiopsis is a genus of lichen-forming fungi in the family Pilocarpaceae. It was circumscribed in 2002 by lichenologists Robert Lücking and Rolf Santesson. It has two species:

 Calopadiopsis aeruginescens 
 Calopadiopsis tayabasensis

References

Pilocarpaceae
Lichen genera
Lecanorales genera
Taxa named by Rolf Santesson
Taxa named by Robert Lücking
Taxa described in 2002